Eric Pédat (born 23 July 1967) is a retired Swiss football goalkeeper.

Personal life
Pédat is the father of the professional footballer Nils Pédat.

References

1969 births
Living people
Swiss men's footballers
Servette FC players
Étoile Carouge FC players
FC St. Gallen players
Association football goalkeepers
Swiss Super League players
Footballers from Geneva